Fountaintown is an unincorporated community in Duplin County, North Carolina, United States.

The town's name is sometimes written as two words, Fountain Town, or simply as Fountain. Fountaintown was founded by the Fountain family from a land grant from the King of England.

The Futral Family Farm was listed on the National Register of Historic Places in 1989.

References

Unincorporated communities in North Carolina
Unincorporated communities in Duplin County, North Carolina